Mr. Harrigan's Phone is a 2022 American teen horror drama film written and directed by John Lee Hancock. It is based on the novella of the same name by Stephen King from the collection If It Bleeds. The film stars Donald Sutherland, Jaeden Martell, Joe Tippett, and Kirby Howell-Baptiste.

Mr. Harrigan's Phone was released on October 5, 2022, by Netflix. The film received mixed reviews.

Plot
In 2003, young Craig becomes acquainted with retired businessman John Harrigan following the death of his mother, with instructions to simply read to him three times a week. Five years later, a teenage Craig and elderly Harrigan have become friends. 

During this time, Craig starts high school and becomes close to Ms. Hart, a teacher who comes to his aid when Kenny Yankovich, a school bully, attempts to intimidate him. After winning $3,000 from a lottery ticket that Harrigan gave him and receiving his first iPhone for Christmas, Craig buys Harrigan one too. Despite initial resistance to new technology, he greatly enjoys the phone.

The elderly Harrigan dies, leaving Craig heartbroken at the loss of his friend. At the funeral, Craig sneaks Harrigan's phone into the coffin. He is then informed by Harrigan's associate that he was left a bequest in Harrigan's will. Craig will receive $800,000 in a trust fund, to support his future studies and pursuit of a writing career, which he had told Harrigan about. 

Craig calls Harrigan's phone as a gesture of thanks. The next morning, he discovers that Harrigan sent him an odd text message, though his father chalks it up to being a bug within the iPhone itself.

Life goes on for Craig, who goes to a dance with his crush, only to be attacked by Kenny, who accuses Craig of getting him expelled from school by ratting out his drug-dealing activities on school grounds. Later that night, Craig calls Harrigan's phone in a fit of frustration and sadness; he tells him he is "afraid that this won't end, and I wish that you were here just to give me some advice." 

Kenny is found dead the next day, having apparently fallen from his bedroom window while attempting to sneak out. Scared by what happened, Craig goes to an Apple store, upgrades his phone to a newer model, and puts away his old one.

Craig eventually graduates from high school and departs for college in Boston, preparing to study journalism. While there, his father calls him to tell him Ms. Hart was killed in a car accident involving a drunk driver, leaving her fiancé hospitalized. The driver, Dean Whitmore, isn't charged for the accident and is instead sent to rehab. 

Infuriated by the outcome, Craig returns to his room and uses his old phone to call Harrigan, explicitly wishing death on Whitmore. After some time, Craig learns Whitmore was found dead in his shower. He drives to the rehab center and bribes a worker there to give him details about the suicide. He is told that Whitmore swallowed shampoo and a piece of broken soap bar. Craig is disturbed to learn that the soap is the same brand used by Ms. Hart, and Whitmore's suicide note is actually a lyric from the song "Stand by Your Man" by Tammy Wynette; Harrigan's ringtone.

Craig breaks down and returns to his hometown. From there, he sees Harrigan's "secret closet" (which he had refused to let Craig enter) was actually a shrine to his deceased mother and visits his gravestone, apologizing for his messages. He theorizes that Harrigan's odd text messages to him are his way of begging Craig to let his spirit rest in peace and for him to move forward in the here and now. 

As he leaves Harrigan's grave, Craig visits his own mother's grave and collapses in tears, begging for forgiveness. He then rushes to the town quarry, contemplating the water while standing very near the edge before throwing his phone into the water. As Craig walks away, he quietly narrates that when he himself passes on and is buried, he wants his pockets to be empty.

Cast

 Donald Sutherland as John Harrigan 
 Jaeden Martell as Craig
 Colin O'Brien as young Craig
 Joe Tippett as Craig's father
 Chelsea Kurtz as Craig's mother 
 Kirby Howell-Baptiste as Ms. Hart
 Cyrus Arnold as Kenny Yankovich
 Thomas Francis Murphy as Pete Bostwick
 Peggy J. Scott as Edna Grogan
 Thalia Torio as Regina
 Alexa Shae Niziak as Margie Marie

Production
In July 2020, Netflix acquired the film rights to "Mr. Harrigan's Phone", to be produced by Blumhouse Productions and Ryan Murphy and with John Lee Hancock writing and directing the film. In October 2021, Donald Sutherland, Jaeden Martell, Kirby Howell-Baptiste, and Joe Tippett joined the cast. Principal photography started in Connecticut on October 20, 2021, and wrapped on December 22, 2021.

Release
The film was released on October 5, 2022, by Netflix.

Critical reception
 

In Common Sense Media, Brian Costello gave it a 4/5 rating saying that "viewers might expect a horror-thriller, but this is more of a coming-of-age story about the perils of revenge and a reflection on how we've changed since the arrival of the smartphone." In The Hollywood Reporter, Frank Scheck said that "unfortunately, despite its intriguing premise, Mr. Harrigan's Phone lacks the necessary ingredient to make it truly memorable; it simply isn't very scary."

In the Arizona Republic, Bill Goodykoontz gave it a 4/5 rating saying that "as with the greatest King stories, the best parts here are not the horror elements (of which there are few). It's the time spent with the characters."

On CinemaBlend, Eric Eisenberg gave it a 2/5 rating saying that "it's a dull and lagging feature that tries to be both a coming-of-age drama and a supernatural horror film, and it ends up failing to make an emotional impact with either genre." Writing in The Guardian, Benjamin Lee also gave the film 2 out of 5 stars, calling it "...a competently made yet utterly inconsequential pre-Halloween time-waster." On IGN, Ryan Leston said, "what’s worse is that this potentially terrifying tale does almost nothing of any horror value throughout its overly long runtime. There are no jump scares, no dream sequences, no monsters, no gore, or anything remotely resembling a hefty-enough scare to warrant calling this a horror film."

References

External links
 
 

2022 drama films
2022 horror films
2020s American films
2020s English-language films
American horror films
American teen drama films
Blumhouse Productions films
English-language Netflix original films
Films about death
Films about mobile phones
Films based on novellas
Films based on works by Stephen King
Films directed by John Lee Hancock
Films produced by Jason Blum
Films produced by Ryan Murphy (writer)
Films scored by Javier Navarrete
Films set in 2003
Films set in 2008
Films shot in Connecticut
Films with screenplays by John Lee Hancock